"The Pet Goat" (often erroneously called "My Pet Goat") is a grade-school level reading exercise composed by American educationalist Siegfried "Zig" Engelmann.  It achieved notoriety for being read by US President George W. Bush with a class of second-graders on the morning of September 11, 2001.  After being discreetly informed of the September 11 attacks midway through the reading by White House Chief of Staff Andrew Card, Bush waited quietly for the reading to finish before dealing with the unfolding crisis.  The episode figures prominently in the retrospective assessment of Bush's response to the September 11 attacks.

Reading exercise
"The Pet Goat" was composed by Siegfried "Zig" Engelmann, who had written over a thousand similar instructional exercises since the 1970s.  It was anthologized in the classroom workbook Reading Mastery: Rainbow Edition, Level 2, Storybook 1.  "The Pet Goat" is designed to teach student about words ending in the letter E, using the Direct Instruction (DI) teaching method.  The exercise tells a story about a girl's pet goat, which her parents want to get rid of because it eats everything; the parents relent after it foils a robbery by butting the intruder, who is now "sore" (that word ending in e).

George W. Bush during the September 11 attacks

On September 11, 2001, US President George W. Bush went to Emma E. Booker Elementary School to meet students and staff and to bring attention to his plans for education reform.  Upon arriving at the Sarasota, Florida school, the president was informed of the first plane crash into One World Trade Center, though he was briefed that it was probably just a small propeller plane.  While President Bush sat in Kay Daniels' classroom, and her students read "The Pet Goat", White House Chief of Staff Andrew Card interrupted the president to whisper in his ear: "A second plane hit the second tower. America is under attack."

Afterwards, the children continued to read and President Bush sat while—as described by The Wall Street Journal—"trying to keep under tight control."  Despite the president's efforts, students knew something was wrong; they later said that the president's face became red and serious, and his expression was "flabbergasted, shocked, [and] horrified".

According to Bill Sammon's book Fighting Back, Bush's gaze flitted about the room—the children, the press, the floor, his staff—while his mind raced about everything he did not yet know.  After receiving cue-card advice from his press secretary, Ari Fleischer ("DON'T SAY ANYTHING YET"), the "notoriously punctual" president lingered in the classroom after the reading exercise was finished: he adamantly did not want to give an appearance of panic.  After chatting with the students and their teacher, Bush deflected a Trade Center-related question from a reporter, and began to learn about the magnitude of the attacks.

Public attention to "The Pet Goat" first came to the fore with Michael Moore's 2004 documentary Fahrenheit 9/11, though the film incorrectly gave the title as "My Pet Goat" and called it a book.  Within a few weeks, a blogger named Peter Smith tracked down the correct name and origin as a reading exercise by Engelmann.

Reactions
The New Yorker described a seven-minute video of President Bush holding Reading Mastery while "staring blankly into space" as the most memorable bit in Fahrenheit 9/11; the film presents the president as faltering in the face of the crisis.

The commander-in-chief's supporters argued that there was nothing for Bush to do but wait for more information while not alarming the pupils.  On his own behalf, Bush said that "his instinct was to project calm, not to have the country see an excited reaction at a moment of crisis. The national press corps was standing behind the children in the classroom; he saw their phones and pagers start to ring. The president felt he should project strength and calm until he could better understand what was happening."  Booker Elementary Principal Tose-Rigell supported the president's reactions at her school—"I don't think anyone could have handled it better.  What would it have served if [Bush] had jumped out of his chair and ran out of the room?"—as did Daniels' students, who later said that Bush's actions were the right ones.

A year after the attacks, Kay Daniels' classroom still had the chair in which the president sat; it was festooned with a purple ribbon.  By 2004, Engelmann (then a retired professor) was surprised at the attention "The Pet Goat" received: "It hasn't brought me any fame, […] It's fascinating that anyone would even be interested in something like this."

Editions

References

animal tales
children's short stories
fiction about goats
George W. Bush
September 11 attacks